La parmigiana (internationally released as The Girl from Parma) is a 1963 Italian comedy drama film directed by Antonio Pietrangeli. The film describes the disappointing sentimental experiences of an orphan girl (Catherine Spaak).

Cast 
 Catherine Spaak: Dora
 Nino Manfredi: Nino Meciotti
 Salvo Randone: Scipio Pagliughi
 Didi Perego: Amneris Pagliughi
 Lando Buzzanca: Michele Pantanò
 Vanni De Maigret: Giacomo Doselli
 Rosalia Maggio: Iris
 Umberto D'Orsi: ingegnere Masselli
 Ugo Fangareggi: waiter in "rosticceria Arcobaleno"
 Mario Brega: plainclothes policeman, in Rome (uncredited)

References

External links

1963 films
1960s coming-of-age comedy-drama films
Films directed by Antonio Pietrangeli
Commedia all'italiana
Films set in Italy
Films set in Emilia-Romagna
Italian coming-of-age comedy-drama films
Films scored by Piero Piccioni
1963 comedy films
1963 drama films
1960s Italian films